VRA Cricket Ground is a cricket ground in Amstelveen, the Netherlands, the home of VRA Amsterdam since 1939. It has a capacity of 7000 spectators and regularly plays host to the Netherlands home games in the World Cricket League, Intercontinental Cup and CB40.

This ground was first used for international cricket when the Netherlands played New Zealand in 1978. It has hosted many One Day Internationals (ODIs) including a match in the 1999 Cricket World Cup, and the 2004 Videocon Cup between India, Pakistan and Australia. It was also used in the 1990 ICC Trophy, the first to be played outside England.

VRA Cricket Ground has hosted some notable moments in Dutch cricket, including a three-run win for the Netherlands over an England XI that featured future England captains Alec Stewart and Nasser Hussain in 1989. In July 2006, the Netherlands played Sri Lanka  in their first home ODI and the visitors scored 443/9 from their 50 overs, which then was the highest team total in ODI cricket.

Located in Amsterdamse Bos, the main ground features a AAA standard turf wicket, while the second and third grounds have an artificial wicket and are used in the winter by Amsterdamsche Hockey & Bandy Club.

The stadium hosted a One Day International (ODI) match during the 1999 Cricket World Cup, between South Africa and Kenya. It was hosted host Nepal's first ever ODI during their Netherlands tour in August 2018.

England scored 498 runs against the Netherlands in June 2022, setting a new record for the highest-ever ODI team score.

List of centuries

One Day Internationals

List of five-wicket hauls

One Day Internationals

References

External links
 Ground profile from Cricinfo
  from VRA Amsterdam website

Cricket grounds in the Netherlands
1999 Cricket World Cup stadiums
Sports venues in Amstelveen